Renat Muradovich Gagity (born 20 March 1995) is a Russian football player.

Club career
He made his professional debut in the Russian Football National League for FC Arsenal Tula on 11 July 2015 in a game against FC Baikal Irkutsk.

References

External links
 

1995 births
People from Prigorodny District, North Ossetia–Alania
Sportspeople from North Ossetia–Alania
Living people
Russian footballers
Association football midfielders
FC Arsenal Tula players
FC Spartak Vladikavkaz players
FC Dynamo Stavropol players
FC Inter Cherkessk players
FC Druzhba Maykop players
FC Mashuk-KMV Pyatigorsk players
Russian First League players
Russian Second League players
Russian expatriate footballers
Expatriate footballers in Lithuania
Russian expatriate sportspeople in Lithuania